Bill Israel is the third studio album by American rapper Kodak Black. It was released on November 11, 2020 through Atlantic Records. The production on the album was handled by multiple producers including Nova Wav, Nick Mira, Charlie Handsome and Taz Taylor among others. The album also features guest appearances from Tory Lanez, Jackboy, Gucci Mane, CBE and Lil Yachty.

Bill Israel was preceded by the single "Pimpin Ain't Eazy". The single failed to appear on the Billboard Hot 100 chart. The album received generally mixed reviews from music critics and achieved low commercial success. It debuted at number 42 on the US Billboard 200 chart, earning 16,000 album-equivalent units in its first week, becoming Kodak's lowest charting album to date.

Background
Kodak took to Instagram to announce his third studio album on October 26, 2020, while serving a 46-month prison sentence. In this post, Kodak revealed the project's title, length, and cover art, which features Kodak alongside a Rabbi, surrounded by doodles. Many of the sketches are religious, such as the multiple crosses, a Star of David, and "#THESTAROFDAVID". These are in reference to Kodak's Hebrew Israelite identity, which he adopted while he was incarcerated after studying scripture with Priest Kahan, a teacher who served as a prison chaplain.

On November 5, 2020, Kodak Black published the album's tracklist. Similar religious imagery to the front cover art is also present on the tracklist.

Commercial performance
Bill Israel debuted at number 42 on the US Billboard 200 chart, earning 16,000 album-equivalent units in its first week. This became Kodak Black's lowest charting album to date.

Track listing

Charts

References

Kodak Black albums
Atlantic Records albums
2020 albums